The 1989 Hall of Fame Tennis Championships and the 1989 Virginia Slims of Newport were tennis tournaments played on grass courts at the International Tennis Hall of Fame in Newport, Rhode Island, in the United States that were part of the 1989 Nabisco Grand Prix and of the Category 3 tier of the 1989 WTA Tour. The men's tournament was held from July 10 through July 16, 1989, while the women's tournament was held from July 17 through July 23, 1989.

Finals

Men's singles

 Jim Pugh defeated  Peter Lundgren 6–4, 4–6, 6–2
 It was Pugh's 5th title of the year and the 15th of his career.

Women's singles

 Zina Garrison defeated  Pam Shriver 6–0, 6–1
 It was Garrison's 4th title of the year and the 21st of her career.

Men's doubles

 Patrick Galbraith /  Brian Garrow defeated  Neil Broad /  Stefan Kruger 2–6, 7–5, 6–3
 It was Galbraith's only title of the year and the 1st of his career. It was Garrow's only title of the year and the 1st of his career.

Women's doubles

 Gigi Fernández /  Lori McNeil defeated  Elizabeth Smylie /  Wendy Turnbull 6–3, 6–7(5–7), 7–5
 It was Fernández's 1st title of the year and the 10th of her career. It was McNeil's 3rd title of the year and the 21st of her career.

External links
 ATP Tournament Profile

Hall of Fame Tennis Championships
Virginia Slims of Newport
Hall of Fame Open
Virginia Slims of Newport
 
Hall of Fame Tennis Championships
Hall of Fame Tennis Championships
Hall of Fame Tennis Championships
Tennis tournaments in Rhode Island